"Simply the Best" (stylized in all caps) is a song by American hip hop group Black Eyed Peas, Brazilian singer Anitta and Dominican rapper El Alfa. It was written by William Adams, Damien Leroy, Emmanuel Herrera Batista, Allan Pineda, Jimmy Luis Gomez, Denis Zet, Jacqueline Hucke and Jerry Ropero.

Live performances
The group performed the song live at the 2023 Sanremo Festival.

Charts

Release history

References

2022 songs
2022 singles
Black Eyed Peas songs